Cyrus Hubbard Wheelock (February 28, 1813 – October 11, 1894) was an early missionary and leader in the Church of Jesus Christ of Latter-day Saints. He wrote the words to the Latter-day Saint hymn "Ye Elders of Israel".

Wheelock was born at Henderson, Jefferson County, New York. He was baptized a member of The Church of Jesus Christ of Latter-day Saints on September 1, 1839. Shortly afterward, he served as a missionary in Vermont.

In 1844, Wheelock tried to convince Governor Thomas Ford of Illinois to release Joseph Smith Jr. from Carthage Jail. Wheelock gave Smith the pistol which he had when the mob attacked the jail at Carthage.

Wheelock served three missions to England. He presided over the Manchester, Liverpool and Preston Conferences.

In 1853, Wheelock was a counselor to Isaac Haight, president of a camp of Latter-day Saints waiting to set out from Keokuk, Iowa. Wheelock was the captain of one of the pioneer companies that crossed the plains to Utah Territory. In 1854, Wheelock became the president of the 37th Quorum of the Seventy.

In 1856, Wheelock was part of a rescue party Brigham Young sent to assist the stranded pioneer companies including the Martin Handcart Company near the Sweetwater River in Wyoming. He served as chaplain of one of the rescue companies

Wheelock settled in Mount Pleasant, Utah Territory. He wrote several hymns while living here.

In 1878 and 1879, Wheelock served as president of the Northern States Mission which then consisted of the states of Michigan, Wisconsin, Minnesota, Iowa and Illinois. He died in Mount Pleasant, Utah Territory.

References 

1813 births
1894 deaths
19th-century American writers
19th-century Mormon missionaries
American Latter Day Saint hymnwriters
American Latter Day Saints
American Mormon missionaries in England
American Mormon missionaries in the United States
Converts to Mormonism
Mission presidents (LDS Church)
Mormon pioneers
People from Henderson, New York
People from Mount Pleasant, Utah